Elections to Buckinghamshire County Council were held on Thursday, 5 May 1977, when the whole council of 70 members was up for election.

The result was that the Conservatives comfortably retained their control, winning sixty-four seats, a gain of eighteen. The ranks of Labour were decimated, and the party was left with only one county councillor, a loss of fifteen. Independents gained two seats, one Ratepayer and one Independent Conservative, but lost one and the Liberals lost the single seat they had had. Three other candidates also won seats.

Election result

|}

Notes

1977
Buckinghamshire
20th century in Buckinghamshire